The Closer You Get... is the seventh studio album by American country music band Alabama, released in 1983. All three singles from this album — "The Closer You Get", "Lady Down on Love" and "Dixieland Delight" — reached Number One on the Hot Country Songs charts in 1983. "She Put the Sad in All His Songs" was also recorded by Ronnie Dunn (who formed the duo Brooks & Dunn with Kix Brooks in 1991) and was released by him as a single in 1983. The album itself reached No. 10 on the Billboard 200, becoming the band's highest-charting album. Considered a stylistic move towards a more pop-friendly sound, the album has been described as a mix of "easy listening" country pop and neotraditional country by AllMusic's Vik Iyengar.

The album was certified quadruple platinum by the Recording Industry Association of America.

Track listing

Personnel

Alabama 
 Randy Owen – lead vocals, electric guitar
 Jeff Cook – electric guitar, backing vocals, lead vocals (5, 10)
 Teddy Gentry – bass guitar, backing vocals, lead vocals (4, 9)
 Mark Herndon – drums

Additional musicians 
 Shane Keister – keyboards
 Willie Rainsford – keyboards
 Jack Eubanks – acoustic guitar
 George "Leo" Jackson – acoustic guitar
 Dave Kirby – electric guitar
 Fred Newell – electric guitar
 William Adair – bass guitar
 Larry Paxton – bass guitar
 Steve Schaffer – bass guitar
 Hayward Bishop – drums
 Farrell Morris – percussion
 Bruce Watkins – fiddle
 Kristin Wilkinson – string arrangements 
 Nashville String Machine – strings

Production 
 Alabama – producers
 Harold Shedd – producer 
 Paul Goldberg – engineer 
 Gene Rice – engineer 
 Randy Kling – mastering at Randy's Roost (Nashville, Tennessee)
 Hogan Entertainment – art direction
 Gabrielle Raumberger – art direction, design 
 Moshe Brakha – photography

Chart performance

Weekly charts

Year-end charts

Singles

Certifications

Notes 

1983 albums
RCA Records albums
Alabama (American band) albums
Albums produced by Harold Shedd